Denise Doring VanBuren was elected the 45th President General of the National Society Daughters of the American Revolution in June 2019, a three-year term.

DAR service

VanBuren joined the DAR through her Patriot Ancestors, father and son, Jacob and Marcus Plattner. She has been involved with the DAR in the City of Beacon, New York, then with the New York State organization before her role at a national level.

As Regent of the Beacon, New York, Melzingah Chapter from 1998 to 2001, VanBuren chaired the Executive Board and was responsible for the stewardship of the 1709 Madam Brett Homestead, the oldest building in Dutchess County. She was named New York State’s Outstanding Chapter Regent in 1999. She led the Melzingah Chapter's efforts to erect a municipal bust in honor of George Washington in Beacon. In 2000, she led a hike to the top of Mount Beacon that involved more than 600 people rededicating Melzingah’s 1900 monument to Revolutionary War soldiers.

She served in three State Chairmanships and as State Historian before serving as New York State Regent from 2010 to 2013. As State Regent, her theme was “Celebrate the Empire State. Excelsior!”

At the National Society, VanBuren served as Organizing Secretary General from 2013 to 2016 and First Vice President General from 2016 to 2019. She has been Editor in Chief of American Spirit and Daughters since 2004.

VanBuren was installed as the 45th DAR President General in 2019 during the 128th Continental Congress.  She chose the theme "Rise and Shine for America" with the goals of "passionate purpose, increased membership and an improved public image."

Highlights from the VanBuren Administration:
 First ever virtual Continental Congress, held digitally due to the COVID-19 pandemic.
 Release of the DAR’s Continuing Commitment to Equality, in which the DAR "reaffirm[ed] to the membership and the public alike that our organization condemns racism." and stated that, "Bias, prejudice and intolerance have no place in the DAR or America."

She is also a member of the Daughters of Union Veterans of the Civil War.

Historical organizations and books

VanBuren served five-terms as President of the Beacon Historical Society, and co-authored two books, Historic Beacon (1998) and Beacon Revisited (2003), to benefit that organization. She served two terms as President of the Dutchess County Historical Society, and two terms as President of the Exchange Club of Southern Dutchess.

Professional work

In 1993, VanBuren joined the media relations group at Central Hudson Gas & Electric Corporation in Poughkeepsie, NY. She became a Vice President in 2000, ultimately serving as Vice President of Public Relations from 1993 to her retirement from that organization effective January 2020.

Board service
VanBuren serves on the following Boards:

Mid-Hudson Regional Hospital
Hudson River Valley Institute at Marist College
Boscobel, Inc.
Dutchess Tourism, Inc. (past Chair)

Education
VanBuren graduated from St. Bonaventure University, and then went on to obtain an MBA from Mount St. Mary College.

References 

Living people
Year of birth missing (living people)
Place of birth missing (living people)
Daughters of the American Revolution people
People from Beacon, New York
St. Bonaventure University alumni
Mount St. Mary's University (Los Angeles) alumni